This is a list of schools in Powys in Wales.

Primary schools

Abermule Community Primary School
Archdeacon Griffiths Church in Wales School
Arddleen Community Primary School 
Berriew Community Primary School
Brynhafren Community Primary School
Builth Wells Community Primary School
Buttington/Trewern Community Primary School
Caersws Community Primary School
Carreghofa Community Primary School
Churchstoke Community Primary School
Clyro Church in Wales School
Cradoc Community Primary School
Crickhowell Community Primary School
Crossgates Community Primary School
Forden Church in Wales School
Franksbridge Community Primary School
Gladestry Church in Wales School
Guilsfield Community Primary School
Hay-on-Wye Community Primary School
Irfon Valley Community Primary School
Knighton Church in Wales School
Leighton Community Primary School
Llanbedr Church in Wales School
Llanbister Community Primary School
Llandinam Community Primary School
Llandysilio Church in Wales School
Llanelwedd Controlled School
Llanfaes Community Primary School
Llanfechain Church in Wales School
Llanfihangel Rhydithon Community Primary School
Llanfyllin Community Primary School 
Llangattock Community Primary School
Llangedwyn Church in Wales Primary School
Llangors Church in Wales School
Llangynidr Community Primary School
Llanidloes Community Primary School
Llanrhaeadr ym Mochnant Community Primary School
Llansantffraid Church in Wales School
Maesyrhandir Community Primary School
Montgomery Church in Wales School
Mount Street Infants School
Mount Street Junior School
Newbridge-on-Wye Church in Wales School
Penygloddfa Community Primary School
Presteigne Community Primary School
Priory Church in Wales School
Radnor Valley Community Primary School
Rhayader Church in Wales School
Sennybridge Community Primary School 
St. Mary's RC Primary School
St. Michael's Church in Wales School
Treowen Community Primary School
Welshpool Church in Wales School
Ysgol Bro Cynllaith
Ysgol Bro Tawe
Ysgol Calon y Dderwen
Ysgol Cefnllys (Llandrindod Wells Community Primary School)
Ysgol Cwm Banwy
Ysgol Dafydd Llwyd
Ysgol Dolafon
Ysgol Dyffryn Trannon
Ysgol Glantwymyn 
Ysgol Golwg y Cwm
Ysgol Gymraeg Dyffryn y Glowyr
Ysgol Gymraeg Y Trallwng
Ysgol Gynradd Carno
Ysgol Llanbrynmair
Ysgol Meifod
Ysgol Pennant
Ysgol Pontrobert
Ysgol Rhiw Bechan
Ysgol Trefonnen
Ysgol y Cribarth
Ysgol y Mynydd Du
Ysgol-y-Bannau

Secondary schools
Brecon High School
Ysgol Calon Cymru (dual campus, formerly Builth Wells High School and Llandrindod Wells High School)
Crickhowell High School 
Gwernyfed High School 
Llanidloes High School
Maesydderwen Comprehensive School
Newtown High School (dual campus, formerly Newtown High School, Newtown and John Beddoes School, Presteigne)
Welshpool High School

All-age schools 
Ysgol Bro Hyddgen (3-18 years)
Ysgol Llanfyllin (3-18 years)
Ysgol Bro Caereinion (3-18 years)

Special schools 
Ysgol Cedewain
Ysgol Neuadd Brynllywarch Hall
Ysgol Penmaes

Independent Special schools 
 Ty Orbis Special School (Owned by Orbis Schools)

Independent schools
Christ College, Brecon
OneSchool Global UK, Newtown

 
Powys